Am seidenen Faden may refer to:

 By a Silken Thread (Am seidenen Faden), a 1938 German drama film
 Am seidenen Faden (album), a 2013 album by Tim Bendzko